HMG may refer to:

Businesses and organisations
 His Majesty's Government (term), a Commonwealth state's executive
Government of Canada
Government of Gibraltar
Government of New Zealand
Government of the United Kingdom
 Holland Media Groep, Dutch TV broadcaster
 Human Media Group, American multi-channel network
 Hyundai Motor Group, South Korean car manufacturer

Science and technology
 Heavy machine gun, a class of larger-caliber weapon
 High-mobility group, a group of proteins that act on DNA
 HMG-CoA, a metabolic intermediate biomolecule
 HMG Heat and Waterproof Adhesive
 Human menopausal gonadotrophin, a fertility drug
 Human Molecular Genetics, a scientific journal